Joseph Essien Mbong (born 15 July 1997) is a professional footballer who plays as a wing-back for Maltese side Ħamrun Spartans. Born in Nigeria, he represents the Maltese national team.

Personal life
Mbong is of Nigerian descent. His father Essien Mbong was also a footballer and spent most of his career with Hibernians. He is the older brother of fellow Maltese international Paul Mbong and Siggiewi forward Emmanuel Mbong.

References

External links

1997 births
Living people
Sportspeople from Lagos
People with acquired Maltese citizenship
Maltese footballers
Malta international footballers
Nigerian footballers
Maltese people of Nigerian descent
Association football forwards
NK Inter Zaprešić players
Hibernians F.C. players
Ħamrun Spartans F.C. players
Hapoel Ironi Kiryat Shmona F.C. players
Maltese expatriate footballers
Expatriate footballers in Croatia
Expatriate footballers in Israel
Maltese expatriate sportspeople in Croatia
Maltese expatriate sportspeople in Israel
Maltese Premier League players
Israeli Premier League players
Malta youth international footballers
Malta under-21 international footballers
Nigerian emigrants to Malta